Ancylosis sulcatella is a species of snout moth in the genus Ancylosis. It was described by Hugo Theodor Christoph in 1877, and is known from Turkmenistan, Syria and Israel.

References

Moths described in 1877
sulcatella
Moths of the Middle East